Orthodox schism is one of the names of the 2018 Moscow–Constantinople schism (the latter is also called the Orthodox Church schism)

Orthodox schism may also refer to:

In the Eastern Orthodox Church 

 One of three schisms between the Churches of Moscow and Constantinople (of which is the 2018 Moscow–Constantinople schism)
 The Raskol, the splitting of the Russian Orthodox Church into an official church and the Old Believers movements in the mid-17th century
 One of three schisms between the Church of Rome and the Church of Constantinople
 The union accomplished at the Council of Florence of the Patriarchate of Constantinople to the Catholic Church

In the Oriental Orthodox Churches 

 Schisms within the Malankara Church
 The 1991–2018 schism within the Ethiopian Orthodox Tewahedo Church

See also 

 Schism (disambiguation)
Eastern Orthodox Church
Category:Schisms from the Eastern Orthodox Church
Oriental Orthodox Churches